In January and February 2012, the local weather forecast offices of the National Weather Service confirmed 134 tornadoes in the United States, indicating an above-average period of tornadic activity. On average, 64 tornadoes occur in the first two months of the year, with 35 occurring in January and 29 in February. However, in 2012, the count for the two months was 79 and 55, respectively. The first confirmed tornado in January (and 2012) was an EF0 tornado which struck Fort Bend County in Texas at 1445 UTC on January 9. The last tornado of February was an EF0 that affected Blount County in Tennessee at 0030 UTC on March 1, though in terms of Central Time Zone, where the tornado took place, it was still February 29. The period's strongest tornado was ranked as an EF4 and occurred on February 29 in Saline and Gallatin counties in Illinois. Total economic losses in the United States from the first two months of 2012 amounted to over $600 million.

January 2012 was the third-most active January for tornadoes in the United States since 1950, with 79 tornadoes, behind 1999 and 2008. Two deaths occurred in Alabama on January 23. The activity was the result of a strong La Niña, which contributed to the fourth-warmest January in the United States in recorded history. The unseasonal temperatures led to numerous tornadoes throughout the month, primarily in three tornado outbreaks. The month's largest tornado outbreak occurred from January 25–27, when 27 tornadoes formed across the Southern United States. However, none of these tornadoes exceeded EF1 intensity. A similarly widespread tornado outbreak occurred from January 22–23 and featured 25 tornadoes, of which 10 were classified as significant and thus exceeded EF1 intensity. Throughout the month, tornadoes caused at least $150 million of damage.

February 2012 was slightly less active, with 55 tornadoes, but was still above average. Similar to January, temperatures in the United States were anomalously warm, and the month ranked as the fifteenth-warmest February on record. However, tornadic activity was sparse throughout much of the month, before a large multi-day tornado outbreak took place across the Great Plains and the Ohio River Valley towards the end of the month. The strongest tornado, ranked as an EF4, struck Harrisburg, Illinois on February 29, killing eight. Overall, 15 people were killed during the outbreak, and tornadoes caused $450 million in damages.

United States yearly total

January

January 9 event

January 11 event

January 17 event

January 21 event

January 22 event

January 23 event

January 24 event

January 25 event

January 26 event

January 27 event

February

February 1 event

February 3 event

February 4 event

February 18 event

February 22 event

February 24 event

February 28 event

February 29 event

See also
 Tornadoes of 2012

Notes

References

 01
Tornado,01
Tornado
Tornado
2012, 01